Nikolai Zurabovich Kipiani (born 25 January 1997) is a Russian football player of Georgian descent. He plays as forward.

Club career
On 25 July 2019, he signed a one-year contract with Russian Premier League club Rubin Kazan. On 11 February 2020, he joined Rotor Volgograd on loan until the end of the 2019–20 season. On 21 June 2020, he re-signed with Rotor on a permanent basis.

Club statistics

References

External links
 
 

1997 births
Georgian emigrants to Russia
Footballers from Tbilisi
Living people
Russian footballers
Association football forwards
Russia youth international footballers
Ethnikos Achna FC players
AC Omonia players
Ermis Aradippou FC players
FC Metalurgi Rustavi players
FC Lokomotiv Moscow players
FC Rubin Kazan players
FC Rotor Volgograd players
Russian expatriate footballers
Expatriate footballers in Cyprus
Russian Premier League players